The British Generic Manufacturers Association is a trade association for the British generic drug industry.  It has offices in the City of London.

Warwick Smith is the director general of the association and also of the British Biosimilars Association.  Tim de Gavre, head of Sandoz UK is the chair from 2018.

The association is concerned that a no-deal Brexit could force up the price of generic drugs because it would increase regulatory complexity.

It is a member of the AMR Industry Alliance, a European organization dedicated to combatting antimicrobial resistance.

In 2017, it said it was working with the Department of Health and Social Care to deal with problems caused by generic drug shortages, to address price gauging through a "Health Services Medical Supplies Bill". It explained that some generic drugs were produced by only one supplier "because the total market size is too small to be attractive for generic companies to enter, since they would not recoup the million-pound plus costs of developing, testing and registering a new generic medicine". This has been countered by Andrew Hill from the department of pharmacology and therapeutics at the University of Liverpool.

In June 2019 it reported that the NHS was, on average, paying 193% of the manufacturers' selling price for Category M products, more than 500 medicines which are readily available with wholesalers receiving half of the profit and pharmacies receiving the other half.

In 2022 it called for branded generics and biosimilars to be exempted from the Voluntary Scheme for Branded Medicines Pricing and Access that was introduced in 2019 because the rising rebate rate “is forcing manufacturers to shun the UK market, further reducing price competition”.  This is based on a new analysis conducted by the Office of Health Economics.

External links
 British Generic Manufacturers Association

References

Pharmaceutical industry trade groups
Pharmaceutical industry in the United Kingdom
Trade associations based in the United Kingdom